Rickard Lars Gunnar Roland Rakell (born 5 May 1993) is a Swedish professional ice hockey left winger for the Pittsburgh Penguins of the National Hockey League (NHL). He was selected 30th overall in the 2011 NHL Entry Draft by the Anaheim Ducks.

Playing career

Major junior
Rakell was drafted 41st overall by the Plymouth Whalers in the OHL 2010 Import Draft. Rakell was drafted 30th overall by the Anaheim Ducks in the 2011 NHL Entry Draft. He signed a three-year entry level contract with the Ducks on 3 July 2012.

Professional

Anaheim Ducks
Rakell played his first NHL game following the 2012–13 NHL lockout on 19 January 2013, against the Vancouver Canucks. He registered his first NHL point on 8 November 2013, an assist on an Andrew Cogliano goal in a game against the Buffalo Sabres. Rakell scored his first NHL goal in a Stanley Cup playoff game against goaltender Kari Lehtonen of the Dallas Stars on 25 April 2014.

In March 2016, Rakell was named to Team Sweden at the 2016 World Cup of Hockey but was forced to pull out due to abdominal surgery. Despite recovering in time for the 2016 Stanley Cup playoffs, Rakell claimed he "never felt like himself" and in September 2016, he underwent further surgery to remove scar tissue from his stomach as a result of his appendectomy.

On 14 October 2016, Rakell signed a six-year contract with the Ducks. Despite missing 10 games due to visa problems, Rakell put up a career high 51 points in 71 games.

In the 2017–18 NHL season, Rakell received a spot in the Pacific Division team for the NHL All-Star Game in Tampa, Florida. He recorded his first career NHL hat-trick on 25 February 2018 in a 6–5 shootout loss to the Edmonton Oilers.

Pittsburgh Penguins
On 21 March 2022, with Anaheim out of a playoff spot and with Rakell set to become an unrestricted free agent, the Ducks sent Rakell to the Pittsburgh Penguins in exchange for a 2022 second-round pick, Dominik Simon, Zach Aston-Reese and Calle Clang.

On 11 July 2022, Rakell signed a six-year, $30 million contract extension with the Penguins.

International play

Rakell has represented Sweden three times at the IIHF World U20 Championship, in 2011, 2012 and 2013, placing second, first and fourth, respectively.

Rakell would make his senior debut at the 2018, where he led Team Sweden in scoring with 14 points and winning gold. He was also named to the tournament all-star team.

Personal life
His grandfather was Åke Rakell, a Swedish international table tennis player. Rakell's brother Robin is an ice hockey player for Gjøvik Hockey in Norway.

Career statistics

Regular season and playoffs

International

Awards and honors

References

External links
 

1993 births
Living people
AIK IF players
Anaheim Ducks draft picks
Anaheim Ducks players
National Hockey League All-Stars
National Hockey League first-round draft picks
Norfolk Admirals players
Pittsburgh Penguins players
Plymouth Whalers players
Ice hockey people from Stockholm
Swedish ice hockey left wingers
People from Sollentuna Municipality